James Ramey may refer to:

 Baby Huey (singer) (James Thomas Ramey, 1944–1970), American rock and soul singer
 James Ramey (politician) (1917–2015), American politician in South Dakota
 James T. Ramey (1914–2010), American lawyer and nuclear expert